Francis "Dink" Trout (June 18, 1898 – March 26, 1950) was an American actor, voice artist and radio personality.

Early years
Trout was born in 1898 in Illinois. He attended the University of Illinois.

Radio
In 1927, Trout had his own musical program on WOR in Newark, New Jersey.

Much of his career involved playing characters in American radio shows. He was heard as Waldo Binney on The Life of Riley, as Mr. Anderson on The Dennis Day Show and as Luke Spears on Lum and Abner. He was also heard in The Adventures of Ozzie and Harriet, the Cass Daley Show, The Nebbs, and The Jim Backus Show.

Stage
On Broadway, Trout had the role of Zappo in The Wild Rose (1926).

Music
Trout played marimba and trombone for Ben Bernie and his orchestra.

Film
In 1936 Trout made his first (uncredited) film appearance in Under Your Spell. Later in 1941 he appeared in Scattergood Baines as Plinky Pickett. Trout reprised this role for the next two films in the Scattergood Baines chronology. He made several other film appearances throughout his life, though he was generally uncredited. In 1947 he voiced the title character in Disney's Bootle Beetle, a character he continued to voice for the next three years. He also played Phink, the pressure cooker salesman in the unaired Three Stooges TV pilot, Jerks of All Trades. His final performance was as the voice of the King of Hearts in Alice in Wonderland, which was released over a year after his death.

Death
Trout died March 26, 1950, in Hollywood, after having had major surgery.

Filmography

 Under Your Spell (1936) - Small Man (uncredited)
 Scattergood Baines (1941) - Pliny Pickett
 Scattergood Baines Pulls the Strings (1941) - Pliny Pickett
 Miss Polly (1941) - Postman Wilbur Boggs
 Cinderella Swings It (1943) - Pliny Pickett
 Gildersleeve's Bad Day (1943) - Otis (uncredited)
 It's a Great Life (1943) - Little Man (uncredited)
 Food and Magic (1943, Documentary short) - Meek Butcher Customer (uncredited)
 Up in Arms (1944) - Startled Man in Cable Car (uncredited)
 The Doughgirls (1944) - Young Husband (uncredited)
 Irish Eyes Are Smiling (1944) - Meek Husband (uncredited)
 A Tree Grows in Brooklyn (1945) - Undetermined (uncredited)
 Sudan (1945) - Bedai the Potter (uncredited)
 The Horn Blows at Midnight (1945) - Trumpet Player (uncredited)
 Notorious (1946) - Court Clerk (uncredited)
 Bootle Beetle (1947, short) - Bootle Beetle (voice)
 So Dear to My Heart (1948) - Bob Peters - Station Agent (uncredited)
 Sea Salts (1949, short) - 'Mac' Bootle Beetle (voice, uncredited)
 Jerks of All Trades (1949, TV pilot) - Mr. Phink
 The Greener Yard (1949, short) - Bootle Beetle (voice)
 Morris the Midget Moose (1950, short) - Old Bootle Beetle / Balsam (voice, uncredited)
 Alice in Wonderland (1951) - King of Hearts (voice) (final film role)

References

External links
 
 

1898 births
1950 deaths
American radio personalities
American male film actors
American male radio actors
American male voice actors
Male actors from Illinois
People from Beardstown, Illinois
University of Illinois alumni
20th-century American male actors